Sevinj Jafarzade (born 1 June 1994) is an Azerbaijani footballer who plays as a midfielder for Krasnodar and the Azerbaijan women's national team.

International goals

See also
List of Azerbaijan women's international footballers

References

1994 births
Living people
Women's association football midfielders
Azerbaijani women's footballers
Azerbaijan women's international footballers
Russian Women's Football Championship players
Kubanochka Krasnodar players
Azerbaijani expatriate footballers
Azerbaijani expatriate sportspeople in Russia
Expatriate women's footballers in Russia